The United States census of 1880 conducted by the Census Bureau during June 1880 was the tenth United States census.  It was the first time that women were permitted to be enumerators. The Superintendent of the Census was Francis Amasa Walker. This was the first census in which a cityNew York Cityrecorded a population of over one million.

Data collected
Five schedules were authorized by the 1880 Census Act, four of which were filled out by the enumerators:
 Schedule 1 (Population), which was similar to that used for the previous census, with a few exceptions.
 Schedule 2 (Mortality), which used the same inquiries as in 1870, and added inquiries to record marital status, birthplace of parents, length of residence in the United States or territory, and name of place where the disease was contracted, if other than place of death.
 Schedule 3 (Agriculture), which greatly expanded inquiries concerning various crops (including acreage for principal crop), and included questions on farm tenure, weeks of hired labor, annual cost for fence building and repair, fertilizer purchases, and the number of livestock.
 Schedule 5 (Manufacturing), which expanded to include information on the greatest number of hands employed at any time during the year, the number of hours in the ordinary work day from May to November and November to May, the average daily wages paid to skilled mechanics and laborers, months of full-and part-time operation, and machinery used.

Schedule 4 (Social statistics) was the responsibility of experts and special agents, rather than the enumerators.  The majority of the data came from correspondence with officials of institutions providing care and treatment of certain members of the population. Experts and special agents also were employed to collect data on valuation, taxation, and indebtedness; religion and libraries; colleges, academies, and schools; newspapers and periodicals, and wages.

Special agents were also charged with collecting data on specific industries throughout the country, and included the manufactures of iron and steel; cotton, woolen, and worsted goods; silk and silk goods; chemical products and salt; coke and glass; shipbuilding; and all aspects of fisheries and mining, including the production of coal and petroleum.

Full documentation for the 1880 population census, including census forms and enumerator instructions, is available from  the Integrated Public Use Microdata Series, which contains microdata.

Data availability
The original census enumeration sheets were microfilmed by the Census Bureau; after which the original sheets were transferred to various state archives, libraries, or universities. The microfilmed census is available in rolls from the National Archives and Records Administration. Several organizations also host images of the microfilmed census online, along which digital indices.

Microdata from the 1880 population census are freely available through the Integrated Public Use Microdata Series. Aggregate data for small areas, together with compatible cartographic boundary files, can be downloaded from the National Historical Geographic Information System.

Results
The 1880 census determined the resident population of the United States to be 50,189,209, an increase of 30.2 percent over the 38,555,983 persons enumerated during the 1870 census.  The mean center of United States population for 1880 was in Boone County, Kentucky.

The results from the census were used to determine the apportionment for the 48th, 49th, 50th, 51st, and 52nd sessions of the United States Congress.

The processing of the 1880 census data took so long (eight years) that the Census Bureau contracted Herman Hollerith to design and build a tabulating machine to be used for the next census. The 1880 census also led to the discovery of the Alabama paradox.

Source: Table I, Population of the United States, by States and Territories

City rankings

References

United States Census, 1880
United States census
United States